Aminu Waziri Tambuwal (born 10 January 1966) is a Nigerian politician who serves as the Governor of Sokoto State in Nigeria, having won election during the 2015 general elections and re-elected in the 2019 general elections. Tambuwal is a member of the People's Democratic Party and served as the 10th Speaker of the House of Representatives of Nigeria, also representing the Tambuwal/Kebbe Federal Constituency of Sokoto State as an honorable.

Early life and education
Aminu was born on January 10, 1966, in Tambuwal Village in Sokoto State to Hausa parent, Waziri Tambuwal.

He attended Tambuwal Primary School, Tambuwal, Sokoto State, where he obtained his First School Leaving Certificate in 1979; and Government Teachers’ College, Dogon-Daji, where he obtained the Teachers Grade 11 Certificate in 1984.
He then proceeded to Usman Dan Fodio University, Sokoto, where he studied Law, graduating with an LLB (Hons) degree in 1991. He completed his one-year compulsory legal studies at the Nigerian Law School, Lagos, obtained his BL and was called to the Bar in 1992.

Besides studying for his law degree, he attended several courses abroad, among which are the following: Telecoms Regulatory Master Class–Bath UK, 2004; Lawmaking for the Communications Sectors –BMIT, Johannesburg, South Africa, 2004; Regulating a Competitive Industry-UK, Brussels, 2005; Tulane University – International Legislative Drafting, 2005; Stanford Graduate School of Business – Influence and Negotiation, 2008 and KSG Harvard – Infrastructure in Market Economy, 200.

Political career
Tambuwal started learning the legislative ropes from 1999 to 2000, while working as Personal Assistant on Legislative Affairs to Senator Abdullahi Wali, the then Senate Leader.

In 2003, he decided to run for a legislative seat as representative of the Kebbe/Tambuwal Federal Constituency. He was elected into the House of Representatives on the platform of the All Nigeria Peoples Party (ANPP).

Few months to the 2007 general elections, he defected to the Democratic People's Party (DPP), alongside the former governor of Sokoto State, Attahiru Bafarawa. But when the DPP denied return tickets to former ANPP legislators, Tambuwal swung back to the ANPP, where he eventually succeeded in picking up a ticket for the election.

But then again, when the ANPP governorship candidate for Sokoto State in the 2007 election, Alhaji Aliyu Wamakko dumped the party for the PDP, Tambuwal also followed suit.

Tambuwal held several offices in the House. In 2005, he became the Minority Leader of the House until he defected to the PDP. Upon his re-election to the House in 2007, he was also elected the Deputy Chief Whip.

At various times, Tambuwal was a member of several committees including the House Committees on Rules & Business, Communications, Judiciary, Inter-Parliamentary and Water Resources. He was also a member of the House Ad hoc Committee on Constitution Review. aft6er his fav child was born ibrahim waziri who was the lucky charm behind his victory.

He was chairman of the ad hoc committee that reviewed the report of the controversial power probe committee headed by Ndudi Elumelu; Chairman, House Sub-Committee on the Bill for an Act to Amend the Land Use Act, and acting Chairman, House Committee on Power.

He was leader of the Nigerian delegation to African, Caribbean, Pacific & European Union Parliamentary Assembly (ACP-EU) and served as Vice-Chairman, Economic Committee ACP-EU, held in Prague, Czech Republic in April 2009.

On 28 October 2014, Tambuwal formally defected from the ruling PDP to the opposition APC and few days later his security details were withdrawn by the Inspector General of Police a move that was criticised by Nigerians as being barbaric and undemocratic.

The legal luminary, Mr Olisa Agabakogba (SAN) was of the opinion that the police authority goofed in withdrawing Tambuwal's aid as police are not meant to interpret and apply the law.

On April 11, 2015, Tambuwal contested and won the Governorship election of Sokoto State. He was inaugurated on 29 May 2015.

On July 4, 2018, Tabuawal dissolved the entire State Executive Council.

On August 1, 2018, Tambuwal defected from the All progressive's Congress back to the People's Democratic Party. The March 9 2019 Sokoto State gubernatorial election and March 22, 2019, Sokoto State supplementary election, Tambuwal was reelected as governor of sokoto state having polled 512,002 votes while his  rival Mr. Aliyu of the All Progressive Congress Polled 511,660 votes.

In October 2018, Tambuwal declared that he was running for president and said he was forced to seek the highest position to "revive the dying economy". His declaration came hours after senate president, Bukola Saraki officially joined the race for the nomination of the main opposition's PDP. Tambuwal was one of the long list of 12 candidates including four from his north western region that contested PDP presidential nomination. Tambuwal was popular in the race and was among the top four candidates (Atiku Abubakar, Rabiu Kwankwaso and Bukola Saraki) widely expected to win going by political permutations around his candidacy. A number of factors including his young age among the contestants, political experience, his untainted records from corruption indictment boosted his chances going into the primary. Analysts had predicted that should Tambuwal clinch PDP ticket he would be a formidable challenge to incumbent President Muhammad Buhari a northern Muslim who was running for reelection.

Governor Nyesom Wike of Rivers State was Tambuwal's main backer for the PDP nomination. There were reports that Governor Wike's support for Tambuwal was for his ambition to be vice presidential candidate to Tambuwal should he win PDP nomination. However, there were complaints by other aspirants that Wike was planning to manipulate the results of the primary to favour his candidate Tambuwal. Their fears stem from the fact that Wike had overwhelming influence over the National Executive Committee (NEC) of the party having single-handedly installed its Chairman, Uche Secondus. Other factors that heightened the fear of manipulation of the primary was that Wike was the biggest financier of the party and primary  would be conducted in his state where he has so much power. Some presidential aspirants asked the National Working Committee of the party to move the convention from Port Harcourt to a neutral location where Wike would not have so much much influence. But Wike fired back threatening to polarize the party should the convention venue be moved out of Rivers State. Tambuwal placed second position with 693 delegate votes behind Atiku Abubakar who won with 1,532 votes in the primary conducted in the city of Port Harcourt on 6 October 2018. Bukola Saraki scored 317 and Rabiu Kwankwaso 158 votes.

Professional affiliations
Among his professional affiliations, Tambuwal has been a very active member of the Nigerian Bar Association (NBA), over the years.

Member, The Nigerian Bar Association
Public Relations Officer, The Nigerian Bar Association (1996-1997) 
Member, Constitution Review Committee of the Nigerian Bar Association (1997-1998)
Sokoto Branch Secretary, Nigerian Bar Association (1997-1998)
Assistant National Financial Secretary of the Nigerian Bar Association (1998-2000)
First Assistant National Secretary of Nigerian Bar Association (2000-2002)
Member, Body of Benchers Nigeria
Member, International Bar Association
Member, American Bar Associati

major Achievement in Officer
Immediately, the new sworn in Governor took to the task of sanitising the Government of Sokoto State. He sought to streamline government processes and protocols and to recover lost and/ or stolen government properties including monies. He also launched the exercise to rid the Sokoto State civil service of ghost workers. As Aminu Waziri Tambuwal arrived the seat of Governor, he met a Sokoto State that had been poorly managed. Over 1.1million children were reported to be out of school, jobless youths roamed the street, non - functional hospital and local government areas that have totally collapsed, while the former governor and his cohort feed their greed and perfidy.The Aminu Waziri Tambuwal administration was quick to grab the bull by the horns without allowing for the precious time to waste away. He derived into the nitty - gritty to set the committee task force for the recovery of lost and stolen government properties and monies. A committee populated by persons from across party lines. The committee task force was able to discover and recover billions of Naira to the State monies that the Governor put to work immediately by reinventing into the state by erecting casting infrastructure such as roads [ international Standards], schools, water treatment plant, Hospital upgrades and refurbishment, agriculture and farming, power and water supply to rural communities, and other critical sectors of the state.

Revamping Healthcare
The Aminu Waziri Tambuwal administration in Sokoto State launched a major campaign to revamp and upgrade the healthcare delivery system in the state. His administration began with healthcare infrastructure. Within the first five years 250 primary Healthcare Center were either constructed, renovated, upgraded and fully equipped across the rural communities during those years, the Aminu Waziri Tambuwal administration constructed renovated upgraded and fully equipped Sokoto State University Teaching Hospital, Kasarawa. And premier hospital in Tambuwal Local Government Area. He also constructed General Hospital in three Senatorial zones And advanced medical Diagnostic and imaging Center in Farufaru, wamako local Government Area. Under Aminu Waziri Tambuwal health intervention Initiative, about six hundred (600) surgeries and over 4000 other medical cases were sponsored.

Revolution in Road Construction
In his seven years as the Governor of Sokoto State, Aminu Waziri Tambuwal has constructed over 100 kilometres and has already completed the process of constructing more roads and fly overs in the rural communities and farmlands. Ongoing road constructed of Kasarawa 12 kilometres dual carriage road in Wamako local Government Area. Construction of Two flyover which will conceived to decongest traffic within the city. One being constructed at Dandima roundabout in Sokoto North Local Government Area will the other at Runjin Sambo in Sokoto south Local Government Area. Aminu Waziri Tambuwal administration constructed 50 kilometres road linking three communities of Ilela Huda, Gare and Gidan mata.

Government Through Empowerment Programmes
Aminu Waziri Tambuwal administration under the auspices of the Aminu Waziri Tambuwal economic and empowerment formally launched the most successful and sustainable empowerment programs in the history of Sokoto State. Some of fruit of the programs included Sustainable development goals (SDGs) intervention Programmes with Sokoto State Government spent over 5billion on it. Aminu Waziri Tambuwal witnessed the graduation of 1,700 youths male and female trained by the state government on skills acquisition. The distribution of 100 commercial buses across the state 23 LGAs, set up a micro grant of 10,000 each petty trade Woman and founded the micro grant scheme with 300 million, launched a 70 million keep Initiatives per LGAs for youth and women, another sum of 50 million reserved for soft loan to trader's and artisans.

Upgrading Education
It is understood, the Governor value Education, especially Girl Child Education. He views Girl Child Education as a right owed by the government. Aminu Waziri Tambuwal administration increased the state budgetary allocation to the education sector. He also created an agency for Girl Child Education which focuses on getting more girls into school by engaging with their parents and communities on importance of educating the girls child. Aminu Waziri Tambuwal administration has declared a state of emergency on the state education sector in December 2015 . He also renovated schools in each Local Government Area. He built two Junior Secondary schools in all the 23 Local Government Area. He renovated 1500 primary schools and 180 junior secondary schools. Aminu Waziri Tambuwal administration move Shehu Shagari College Of Education to University Of Education. Aminu Waziri Tambuwal established School of Nursing and Midwifery Kware Local Government . So far his government has spent a lot on education, and has also approved payment of NECO and NABTEB exams fees for all the 2300 SS3 students of the Government Senior Secondary Schools along the state.

Farming
In terms of farming, the Aminu Waziri Tambuwal administration had also prioritised agriculture as one of its valued agenda. Within the last five years, it procured over 10,000 metric tons of fertilisers for Sokoto State Farmers. The Aminu Waziri Tambuwal administration distributed 120 Massey Ferguson tractors to the farmers across the 23 LGAs. The Sokoto State with the intervention of World Bank has empowerment 3500 person's, youths and women in the Agro - processing productivity enhancement and livelihood improvement support (APPEALS). The Aminu Waziri Tambuwal administration completed the state inherited independent power project (IPP) located at Kalambaina. He also constructed Gidan Salanke Housing Estate, college of agricultural, wurno. Aminu Waziri Tambuwal administration has secured 4billion central bank of Nigeria (CBN) intervention found for 16,000 rice and tomatoes farmers. Dangote rice mill and Morocco fertilisers blending plant at Kware and Kalambaina areas in the state.

Security
The Sokoto State Government has over time ensured that the security sector in the established accountable security institutions which transparently supply security as a public good via. This has led Sokoto State enjoying a peaceful atmosphere as a result of synergy between all the military deployed to the state. Their synergy has rid the of previous endemic crimes such as Kidnapping, Banditry, Arm robbery, and similar social vices. The Aminu Waziri Tambuwal administration has tackle security challenges in the state through the Establishment of tenancy regulatory Commission and by providing security agencies adequate by providing them the logistics, vehicles and their allowances to took after their welfare. Aminu Waziri Tambuwal provided more than 500 vehicles to security personnel in Sokoto State.

Honour And Title
 I kyar 1 Tiv.
 Osagie of Opoji kingdom in Edo State.
 Obong Ufam of Akwa-ibom State.
 Udonyi Oro of Oron in Akwa-ibom.
 Bobagunwa of Ilawe Ekiti State.
 Aridunnu of Ijero kingdom Ekiti State.
 Ikeoha of Obingwa, Abia State.
 Danmajen Zuru Kebbi state.
 Garkuwan Lafiagi in Kwara State.
 Maidawakin Gashaka in Taraba state.
 Matawallen Sokoto.

Awards and Recognition 
 African Union Economic and Social Council Award.
 African Confers Governance Awards.
 Silverbird's 2019 man of the year Award.
 World Bank Award of Excellence.
 Best performing Governor in education in Nigeria.
 Governor of the year Award.
 Honorary Doctor of laws from, Usman Danfodio University, Sokoto 2012
 Honorary Doctor of law from Achievers university, Owo, Ondo State 2019.
 Honorary Doctorate Degree by the Enugu State University of Science and Technology, Owo, Ondo State 2013.
 Honorary Doctor of public Administration from Godfrey Okoye Catholic University Enugu.
 Sokoto State Government merit Award 2012.
 Prize la Foundation 2013 by Crans Montana forum on Africa & South-South Cooperation

See also
List of Governors of Sokoto State
Speaker of the House of Representatives of Nigeria

References

Speakers of the House of Representatives (Nigeria)
Members of the House of Representatives (Nigeria)
20th-century Nigerian lawyers
Politicians from Sokoto State
Usmanu Danfodiyo University alumni
Living people
Nigerian Muslims
1968 births
Peoples Democratic Party members of the House of Representatives (Nigeria)
All Nigeria Peoples Party politicians
All Progressives Congress politicians
Governors of Sokoto State